Maden is a 1978 Turkish film starring Cüneyt Arkın, Tarık Akan and Hale Soygazi, and directed by Yavuz Özkan. It is about a group of miners who decide to strike against a greedy mining company to demand better working conditions. The film is from the wave of political films in Turkey during the 1970s and actually represents one of the highest points of activism in the Turkish cinema as the Turkish left was in its peak point too.

Plot

Cast 
 Cüneyt Arkın ... İlyas
 Tarık Akan ... Nurettin
 Hale Soygazi ... Halkacı Kadın
 Meral Orhonsay ... Nurettin's wife
 Halil Ergün ... Ömer
 Baki Tamer ... Union President
 Nurhan Nur ... Ayşe
 Ahmet Turgutlu ... Company Owner
 Aydın Haberdar ... unionist
 İhsan Yüce

Awards and nominations 
 Golden Orange awards
 Best film
 Best actor (Tarık Akan)
 Best actress (Hale Soygazi)
 Best supporting actress (Meral Orhonsay)

Reception

External links
 

1978 films
Films set in Turkey
1970s Turkish-language films
Best Picture Golden Orange Award winners
1970s thriller drama films
Films about the labor movement
Turkish political films
1970s political thriller films
1970s disaster films
Political thriller films
1970s political drama films
1978 drama films